Wolverhampton Casuals Football Club are a football club based in Featherstone, near Wolverhampton, England. They play their home games at Brinsford Lane, and also compete in the Walsall Senior Cup – a competition they last won in 2000–01.

History
Wolverhampton Casuals Football Club was established in 1899. They joined West Midlands (Regional) League Division Two in 1982–83 and were promoted to Division One the following season. They finished runners-up in Division One for three successive seasons, and were promoted to the Premier Division in 1987–88 after a fourth-place finish. The club reached the First Round of the FA Vase in 1989–90, however The Cassies were relegated back to Division One in 1991. They regained their Premier Division status after winning the league in 1994–95. 
In 2010–11, the club were runners-up in the League Cup. 
For the 2011–12 season local management duo Lee Cooke and Carl Abbott took control of the first team, and following a squad rebuild guided the side to at the time, its best ever, 3rd-place finish in the Premier Division.

Midway through the 2012-13 season, with the side in 4th place in the table, Lee Cooke resigned his position as joint manager on 15 December 2012. Carl Abbott took sole charge of the first team.  During the course of the 2012-13 season Casuals reached the first qualifying round of the FA Cup, taking Midland Alliance side Tividale to a replay, before going out, having disposed of Tipton Town and Pilkington XXX in earlier rounds.  The team finished the season again in 3rd place, in a tightly contested championship with Lye Town and eventual winners AFC Wulfrunians, achieving 97 points for the season, a best ever league record achieved.  Casuals also ended the season as runners up in the JW Hunt Cup, finalists for the first time in the club's history, narrowly losing out in the final to Black Country Rangers.

The following season the team secured their third consecutive 3rd-placed finish in the Premier Division, this time achieving 98 points, again a best ever league record achieved in the club's history, and only 3 points short of the title.  At the end of the season, after a successful four-year spell, Carl Abbott resigned his position as manager in order to take the managerial position at Hinckley. 

He was replaced by former Sporting Khalsa manager Mark Holdcroft who guided the club to a 6th place finish in his first season in charge, and followed this up with a record 2nd place finish the following year with semi final losses in the Staffordshire Senior Cup and Walsall Senior Cup to Stoke City F.C. Under-23s and Academy and Walsall F.C. Youth and Reserves respectively. Mark Holdcroft was replaced the following season following a 9th place league finish, with former Wednesfield F.C. manager Dean Gill taking over the reins.

Dean Gill narrowly missed out on promotion with a 3rd place finish in his first season in charge, winning the West Midlands (Regional) League Premier Division Cup in the process.  Following the COVID-19 outbreak, the 2019–20 season was halted with the "Cassies" in 4th place.  Gill resigned to take over at Bilston Town, which led the club to appoint Adam Pearce as manager.  In 2021, under Pearce’s tutelage, the club were promoted to the Premier Division of the Midland League based on their results in the abandoned 2019–20 and 2020–21 seasons.

Ground
Brinsford Lane boasts a clubhouse, a tearoom, and a small stand with bench seating for approximately 150 people.  Its distinctive ivy-covered dugouts were featured in David Bauckham's book Dugouts.

Honours
West Midlands (Regional) League Premier Division
Runners-up 2016-17
West Midlands (Regional) League Division One
Champions 1994–95
Runners-up 1984–85, 1985–86, 1986–87
West Midlands (Regional) League Premier Division League Cup
Runners-up 2010–11
JW Hunt Cup
Runners up 2012–13
Walsall Senior Cup
Winners 2000-01
Staffordshire Vase
Winners 1997-98
Runners-up 1998-99

Records
Best league position: Runners up in West Midlands (Regional) League Premier Division, 2016-17
Best FA Cup performance: First Qualifying Round, 2012–13
Best FA Vase performance: Second Round, 2016–17

References

External links
Club website
Pyramid Passion feature on their ground

Football clubs in England
Sport in Wolverhampton
Association football clubs established in 1899
West Midlands (Regional) League
Football clubs in the West Midlands (county)
1899 establishments in England
Midland Football League